Syntomus is a genus of beetles in the family Carabidae, containing the following species:

 Syntomus africanus Mateu, 1985 
 Syntomus ai Barsevskis, 1993 
 Syntomus americanus (Dejean, 1831) 
 Syntomus andrewesi (Jedlicka, 1936) 
 Syntomus arrowi (Jedlicka, 1936)  
 Syntomus barbarus Puel, 1938 
 Syntomus bedeli (Puel, 1924) 
 Syntomus bifasciatus (Jedlicka, 1936) 
 Syntomus bresi Verdier, Quezel & Rioux, 1951 
 Syntomus brevipennis (Wollaston, 1864) 
 Syntomus cymindulus (Bates, 1892) 
 Syntomus dilutipes (Reitter, 1887) 
 Syntomus eberti Jedlicka, 1965 
 Syntomus elgonicus (Basilewsky, 1948) 
 Syntomus erythreensis Mateu, 1985 
 Syntomus foveatus (Geoffroy, 1785) 
 Syntomus foveolatus (Dejean, 1831) 
 Syntomus fuscomaculatus (Motschulsky, 1844) 
 Syntomus grayii (Wollaston, 1867) 
 Syntomus hastatus (Andrewes, 1931) 
 Syntomus impar Andrewes, 1930 
 Syntomus impressus (Dejean, 1825) 
 Syntomus inaequalis (Wollaston, 1863) 
 Syntomus jaechi Kirschenhofer, 1988 
 Syntomus javanus (Andrewes, 1937) 
 Syntomus lancerotensis (Wollaston, 1864) 
 Syntomus lateralis Motschulsky, 1855 
 Syntomus leleupi Mateu, 1980 
 Syntomus lundbladi (Jeannel, 1938) 
 Syntomus maculatus (Jedlicka, 1936) 
 Syntomus masaicus Mateu, 1968 
 Syntomus michaelseni (Kuntzen, 1919) 
 Syntomus mongolicus (Motschulsky, 1844) 
 Syntomus montanus (Bedel, 1913) 
 Syntomus monticola (Andrewes, 1923) 
 Syntomus motschulskyi Iablokoff-Khnzorian, 1978
 Syntomus namanus (Kuntzen, 1919) 
 Syntomus nepalensis (Jedlicka, 1964) 
 Syntomus nitidulus (Piochard De La Brulerie, 1868) 
 Syntomus obscuroguttatus (Duftschmid, 1812) 
 Syntomus pallipes (Dejean, 1825) 
 Syntomus paludicola (Gistel, 1857) 
 Syntomus parallelus Ballion, 1871 
 Syntomus philippinus (Jedlicka, 1936)  
 Syntomus pubescens Mateu, 1986
 Syntomus quadripunctatus (Schmidt-Goebel, 1846)
 Syntomus rufulus Mateu, 1980 
 Syntomus silensis (A.Fiori, 1899) 
 Syntomus submaculatus (Wollaston, 1861) 
 Syntomus subvittatus (Bates, 1892) 
 Syntomus transvaalensis Mateu, 1980 
 Syntomus truncatellus (Linnaeus, 1761) 
 Syntomus wutaishanicus Kirschenhofer, 1986
 Syntomus yemenita Mateu, 1986

References

Lebiinae